Saudi Arabia competed at the 1992 Summer Olympics in Barcelona, Spain. Nine competitors, all men, took part in thirteen events in five sports.

Competitors
The following is the list of number of competitors in the Games.

Athletics

Men's Discus Throw
Khaled Al-Khalidi 
 Qualification — 47.96 m (→ did not advance)

Men's Shot Put
Khaled Al-Khalidi 
 Qualification — 17.72 m (→ did not advance)

Cycling

Three cyclists represented Saudi Arabia in 1992.

Men's road race
 Medhadi Al-Dosari
 Saleh Al-Qobaissi
 Mohamed Al-Takroni

Men's team time trial
 Medhadi Al-Dosari
 Saleh Al-Qobaissi
 Mohamed Al-Takroni

Fencing

One fencer represented Saudi Arabia in 1992.

Men's sabre
 Sami Al-Baker

Swimming

Table tennis

References

External links
Official Olympic Reports

Nations at the 1992 Summer Olympics
1992
1992 in Saudi Arabian sport